Anastasia Romanovna Zakharyina-Yurieva (1530 – 7 August 1560) was the first spouse of the Russian Tsar Ivan the Terrible and the first Russian Tsaritsa. She was the mother of Feodor I, the last lineal Rurikid Tsar of Russia and the great-aunt of Michael I of Russia, the first Tsar of the Romanov dynasty.

Early life and ancestry
Anastasia was the second daughter of the boyar Roman Yurievich Zakharyin-Yuriev, who served as Okolnichy during the reign of Grand Prince Vasily III. The house of Zakharyin-Yuriev was a minor branch of a noble family that had already been at court, so it's possible that Ivan met Anastasia before the bride show, though no records of that exist. One of her uncles had been one of Ivan's guardians during the regency of his mother, Grand Princess Elena Glinskaya, who held all the real power. Anastasia's father was descended from the boyar Feodor "Koshka" ("Cat") Kobyla, fourth son of Andrei Kobyla. The origins of her mother, Uliana Ivanovna, are unknown. Anastasia had at least three older siblings – Daniel, Nikita and Anna.  Both girls spent most of their childhood and early youth with their mother and had the traditional upbringing of noblewomen of their rank. Roman Yurievich Zakharyin-Yuriev died on 16 February 1543.

Marriage
Anastasia was selected as the best bride for Ivan from a large number of suitable mates brought to the Kremlin specifically for the selection process.  All the noble families throughout Russia were given an invitation to present their eligible daughters for this purpose (it is said that there were between 500 and 1500 girls to choose from). Anastasia and Ivan's marriage took place on 3 February 1547, at the Cathedral of the Annunciation. She gave birth to a total of six children: Anna, Maria, Dmitry, Ivan, Eudoxia, and Feodor.

It is widely believed that Anastasia had a moderating influence on Ivan's volatile character. Sir Jerome Horsey, an agent for the Russia Company and envoy for the English court, wrote in his memoirs about Anastasia and Ivan IV: "He being young and riotous, she ruled him with admirable affability and wisdom”.
In the summer of 1560, Anastasia fell ill to a lingering illness and died on 7 August. In consequence, Ivan suffered a severe emotional collapse, suspecting that his wife had been a victim of malicious actions and had been poisoned by the boyars. Although he had no evidence of such crimes, he had a number of boyars tortured and executed. Ivan already had a strong dislike of the boyars due to their abusive actions toward him during his childhood. In response to her death, he developed a corps of fearsome black-clad men who terrorized on his behalf, known as the oprichniki.

The examination of Anastasia's remains in the 1990s and at the beginning of the 21st century by archaeologists and forensics experts provided evidence that could sustain her husband's claim. Further research using neutron activation analysis confirmed the acute mercury poisoning of Anastasia. While mercury was also used as a cure, leading to some debate around the issue, the found levels of mercury were too high, according to the experts, and thus the poisoning verdict remains the most accepted one today.

Children 
Tsarevna Anna Ivanovna of Russia (10 August 1548 – 20 July 1550)
Tsarevna Maria Ivanovna of Russia (17 March 1551 – ?); died young.
Tsarevich Dmitry Ivanovich of Russia (October 1552 – 26 June 1553)
Tsarevich Ivan Ivanovich of Russia (28 March 1554 – 19 November 1581); heir of Ivan IV, murdered by his father.
Tsarevna Eudoxia Ivanovna of Russia (26 February 1556 – June 1558)
Tsar Feodor I of Russia (31 May 1557 – 6 January 1598); Ivan IV's successor.

Legacy
Through her marriage to Ivan IV, Anastasia became the link between the two main ruling dynasties in Russian history, the Rurik dynasty and the Romanov dynasty.

Anastasia's brother, Nikita Romanovich, was the father of Feodor Romanov, the first to take the surname Romanov, in honour of his grandfather, father of a tsaritsa. In other words, Feodor Romanov was the first cousin of the last Rurikid tsar, Feodor I. This connection with the derelict dynasty facilitated the election of Feodor's son Mikhail Romanov to the throne after the Time of Troubles.

On 20 August 2010, the Head of the Russian Imperial House, H.I.H. Grand Duchess Maria Vladimirovna of Russia, established the Imperial Order of the Holy Great Martyr Anastasia for women. The Order was established in honor of the Holy Great Martyr Saint Anastasia and in memory of Tsaritsa Anastasia Romanovna. The Order of the Holy Great Martyr Anastasia is granted to women who have distinguished themselves in the areas of charity, culture, medicine, education, science, and other endeavors useful to the nation and society, and who now continue their noble deeds under the patronage of the Head of the Russian Imperial House.

In popular culture

Anastasia is one of the main characters in the ballet Ivan the Terrible by choreographer Yuri Grigorovich with music by Sergei Prokofiev, which premiered on 20 February 1975, at the Bolshoi Theatre, starring Yuri Vladimirov as Ivan IV and Natalia Bessmertnova as Anastasia. The ballet's plot includes the meeting and marriage of Anastasia and Ivan, her poisoning by boyars, and Ivan's fall into darkness and madness after the loss of Anastasia. The ballet has had several revivals.

References 

|-

1530 births
1560 deaths
House of Romanov
Assassinated royalty
Year of birth unknown
Burials at Ascension Convent
Wives of Ivan the Terrible
Deaths by poisoning